Kanwalpreet Singh (born 28 December 1981) is a former Indian field hockey player who played as a defender for the national team. He represented India at the 2006 Men's Hockey World Cup, 2006 Asian Games and 2006 Commonwealth Games. He works for the Punjab Police.

References

External links
Player profile at bharatiyahockey.org

1981 births
Living people
Field hockey players from Jalandhar
Indian male field hockey players
Male field hockey defenders
2002 Men's Hockey World Cup players
2006 Men's Hockey World Cup players
Field hockey players at the 2006 Commonwealth Games
Commonwealth Games competitors for India